Jezebel is a US-based website featuring news and cultural commentary geared towards women. It was launched in 2007 by Gawker Media under the editorship of Anna Holmes as a feminist counterpoint to traditional women's magazines. After the breakup of Gawker Media, the site was purchased by Univision Communications and later acquired by G/O Media.

History
Jezebel was launched on May 21, 2007, as the 14th Gawker Media blog. According to founding editor Anna Holmes, who had previously worked at Glamour, Star, and InStyle, the site stemmed from the desire to better serve Gawker.com's female readers, who made up 70% of the site's readership at the time.

At the site's launch, the editorial staff included Holmes; editor Moe Tkacik, a former Wall Street Journal reporter; and associate editor Jennifer Gerson, a former assistant to Elle editor-in-chief Roberta Myers. Gerson left the site in May 2008 to become the Women's Editor for the Polo Ralph Lauren website; Tkacik departed in August 2008 to work at Gawker.com, after briefly accepting and then rescinding a job offer from Radar. Tkacik was subsequently laid off in a company-wide restructuring the following October. Holmes left the site in June 2010; Jessica Coen replaced her as editor-in-chief. Other current staffers include Madeleine Davies, Kelly Faircloth, Hillary Crosley, Kate Dries and Callie Beusman.

In December 2007, Jezebel reached 10 million monthly views. Gawker's owner Nick Denton pointed to Jezebels soaring popularity as one reason for a drop-off in traffic at the company's main site, Gawker.com, which fell from more than 11 million page views in October 2007 to about eight million in December. Three years after its founding, Jezebel had surpassed the page traffic of its parent site.

According to the New York Times, feminist publications such as Jezebel have been particularly affected by financial turmoil within the news industry. Jezebel was one of six websites that was purchased by Univision Communications in their acquisition of Gawker Media in August 2016. Univision sold the site in 2019 to a private-equity firm, which combined various former Gawker publications under the name of G/O Media.

Contents
Founding editor Anna Holmes says she sought to create a counterpart to women's print magazines such as Vogue and Cosmopolitan. According to Jordan Michael Smith, Holmes "hated [Glamours] worship of luxury, the lack of racial diversity, and the shallowness of women’s publications generally". The site was launched with the tagline "Celebrity. Sex. Fashion. Without airbrushing." Emma Goldberg of The New York Times describes the site's hallmark as "feminist cultural criticism, with an edge".

A regular feature called "Photoshop of Horrors" documents retouched photographs in fashion magazines. On its first day of operation, Jezebel offered a $10,000 reward for the best example of a magazine cover photo prior to being retouched for publication. The winning entry, announced in July 2007, was a photo of country singer Faith Hill from the cover of Redbook. Jezebel pointed out 11 different ways the photo had been altered, including radically distorting Hill's left arm.

A 2007 post by Tkacik says, "Jezebel is a blog for women that will attempt to take all the essentially meaningless but sweet stuff directed our way and give it a little more meaning, while taking more the serious stuff and making it more fun, or more personal, or at the very least the subject of our highly sophisticated brand of sex joke. Basically, we wanted to make the sort of women's magazine we'd want to read." One of the site's guiding principles, according to Holmes, is to avoid saying "misogynist things about women's weight."

Editors-in-Chief

Media attention and influence
Jezebel's format has influenced other women-focused websites, including Slate magazine's Double X, xoJane, The Hairpin, and The Frisky.

Media coverage of the Faith Hill photo controversy included discussion and interviews on NBC's Today show and in several other publications.  Redbook editor-in-chief Stacy Morrison said that their retouching of Hill's photo was in line with industry standards and that Redbook was investigating how the unretouched image had been released.

A July 2008 article in the Ottawa Citizen included Jezebel as one of several sites launched as part of the "online estrogen revolution," referring to a comScore finding that community-based women's websites were tied with political sites as the Internet's fastest-growing category. The article also cited Ad Ages research showing that women's Internet use is outpacing men's.

In 2010, Jezebel received widespread media coverage when it criticized The Daily Show for its treatment of women writers and correspondents. As a result of this publicity, the site was parodied as "JoanOfSnark.com" on an episode of 30 Rock, "TGS Hates Women". Former Gawker staff writer Emily Gould criticized the site in an essay for Slate, saying its pop-culture criticism and "righteously indignant rage" was simply "petty jealousy ... marketed as feminism".

Kashmir Hill of Forbes has been critical of the blog on two occasions. In 2012, Jezebel faced criticism when it published screen shots of a video depicting a rape and some users threatened to boycott the site. Later, in November 2012, Jezebel was criticized for publicizing the names of teenagers who posted racist tweets in response to Barack Obama's re-election.

The website has been criticized at times for how it handles race issues, including its selection in July 2014 of a white woman as the new editor-in-chief over a black candidate who had been with the site since its founding.

In 2014, Jezebel writers accused the company Gawker Media of failing to address a campaign of harassment against its staff and readers, which included rape-themed images and threats of violence. In the post, which was titled "We Have a Rape Gif Problem and Gawker Media Won't Do Anything About It" the site's staff wrote that "an individual or individuals has been using anonymous, untraceable burner accounts to post gifs of violent pornography in the discussion section of stories on Jezebel" for months.

In 2014, Caitlin Dewey of The Washington Post criticized Jezebel for its article about Vogues February issue, which depicted a retouched photograph of actress Lena Dunham on its cover along with retouched images of her within. Dewey described it as a "feminist self-parody", stating that "[Editor-in-chief Jessica] Coen doesn't just object to the type of unrealistic, unhealthy Photoshopping that warps our collective perception of what constitutes a normal size and shape, but to alterations of any kind", which she believes "doesn't really further that cause" of combating distorted body image in advertising.

Confusion has sometimes arisen over whether an article by Jezebel was satirical or not. In 2021, they posted an article asking why the upcoming Mortal Kombat movie didn't feature notable female fighting character Chun-Li. Confused fans quickly pointed out that Chun-Li was from the Street Fighter franchise, which is entirely separate from the Mortal Kombat franchise. NME speculated that the article may have been satirizing fan reactions to Johnny Cage not being in the trailer. However, Jezebel later updated their article with a correction, showing that the article was not written in satire.

References

External links

Gawker Media
American women's websites
Internet properties established in 2007
Feminist blogs
2007 establishments in the United States
Former Univision Communications subsidiaries